Splash! is a British television show which teaches celebrities the art of diving with the aid of Tom Daley. The first series began broadcasting on 5 January 2013 and ended on 2 February 2013. Gabby Logan and Vernon Kay hosted the series, with Andy Banks, Jo Brand and Leon Taylor as judges, and commentary by Alan March.

Contestants
The fifteen celebrities were revealed on 2 January 2013. Jennifer Metcalfe withdrew before the series began and was replaced by Donna Air.

Scoring chart

Red numbers indicate the lowest score for each week
Green numbers indicate the highest score for each week
 indicates the celebrities eliminated each week
 indicates the celebrities in the Splash!-off each week
 indicates the celebrity withdrew that week
 indicates the winning celebrity
 indicates the runner-up celebrity
 indicates the third place celebrity
"—" indicates that the celebrity did not dive that week

Average chart
This table only counts for dives scored on a traditional 30-points scale.

Live show details

Heat 1 (5 January)

Judges' votes to save
 Banks: Jenni Falconer
 Brand: Jake Canuso
 Taylor: Jake Canuso

Heat 2 (12 January)

Judges' votes to save
 Banks: Joey Essex
 Brand: Charlotte Jackson
 Taylor: Charlotte Jackson

Heat 3 (19 January)

Judges' votes to save
 Banks: Linda Barker
 Brand: Tina Malone
 Taylor: Linda Barker

Semi-final (26 January)

* Due to injury Ogogo had to withdraw from the competition

Judges' votes to save
 Banks: Jake Canuso
 Brand: Omid Djalili
 Taylor: Jake Canuso

Final (2 February)

Ratings

References

2013 in British television
2013 British television seasons